Zolotov (feminine: Zolotova) (Cyrillic: Золотов) is a Slavic surname based on the word gold (Золото). Notable people with the surname include:

Andrej Andreevich Zolotov (born 1937), Russian screenwriter and art and music critic who authored 30 documentaries
Nahum Zolotov (1926–2014), Israeli architect
Roman Zolotov (born 1974), Russian ice hockey player
Viktor Zolotov (born 1954), the head of Russian President Vladimir Putin's personal security service

See also

 8142 Zolotov, a main-belt asteroid
 Zolotov Island, Antarctica

Slavic-language surnames